Zvishavane Airport  is a private airport in Zvishavane, Zimbabwe.

See also
Transport in Zimbabwe

References

External links

Airports in Zimbabwe
Buildings and structures in Midlands Province